Karen L. Wiebe is a Canadian ornithologist and the  Stuart and Mary Houston Professor of Ornithology in the Department of Biology at the University of Saskatchewan in Saskatoon, Saskatchewan.

Education
Wiebe received her doctorate at the University of Saskatchewan in 1993.

Research
Wiebe and her students focus on basic research in avian biology and behavior. She studies the ecology and theoretical behavior of birds, with particular attention to their reproductive success.  Factors influencing reproductive success can include habitat, predation, availability of food, and selection of nest sites. Among the birds that she studies are northern flickers, bluebirds and tree swallows. Wiebe leads a long-term study which began in 1997, of flickers at Riske Creek, British Columbia.

References

Living people
Canadian ornithologists
Canadian women scientists
University of Saskatchewan alumni
Academic staff of the University of Saskatchewan
Year of birth missing (living people)